The 1943 Washington Homestead Grays baseball team represented the Washington Homestead Grays in the Negro National League (NNL) during the 1943 baseball season. After having managed the Grays to five pennants in seven seasons, manager Vic Harris elected to step away from managing to take a job with a plant that relegated him to part-time out-fielding. As such, Candy Jim Taylor, a manager for several teams since 1920, was hired to skipper the team. The team compiled a 78–23–1 record and won the NNL pennant for the sixth time in franchise history. They won the right to go to the 1943 Negro World Series and were tasked against the Birmingham Black Barons; the Grays won in seven games for their first World Series title.
 
The team played its home games at Forbes Field in Pittsburgh and Griffith Stadium in Washington, D.C. 

The team's leading batters were:
 Catcher Josh Gibson - .466 batting average, .560 on-base percentage, .867 slugging percentage, 20 home runs, 109 RBIs, 52 bases on balls in 69 games
 Center fielder Jerry Benjamin - .372 batting average, .478 slugging percentage, 40 RBIs in 70 games
 Left fielder Cool Papa Bell - .355 batting average, .436 slugging percentage, 12 stolen bases in 64 games
 Second baseman Howard Easterling - .352 batting average, .502 slugging percentage, 53 RBIs in 63 games
 First baseman Buck Leonard - .331 batting average, .504 slugging percentage, four home runs, 63 RBIs, 47 bases on balls in 67 games
 Third baseman Jud Wilson - .305 batting average, .413 slugging percentage in 63 games 

The team's leading pitchers were Johnny Wright (18–3, 2.54 ERA, 94 strikeouts), Spoon Carter (14–2, 3.83 ERA, 44 strikeouts), Edsall Walker (9–4, 3.36 ERA), and Ray Brown (6–1, 4.10 ERA). 

Five of the Grays players were later inducted into the Baseball Hall of Fame: Cool Papa Bell; Ray Brown; Josh Gibson; Buck Leonard; and Jud Wilson.

References

1943 in sports in Pennsylvania
Negro league baseball seasons